Eulepidotis emilia is a moth of the family Erebidae first described by Constant Bar in 1875. It is found in the Neotropics, including French Guiana, Guyana and Peru.

References

Moths described in 1875
emilia